Lenuk FC is a Vanuatuan football team based in Weso, Malakula Island. Besides football, the club also has a Futsal team. The club plays in the Malekula Premier League.

History
Lenuk FC is founded in 1978 by Pastor George Kanu from Ifira. They play in blue and white.

2016
In 2016 they qualified for the 2016 VFF National Super League for the first time. Though they lost all of their 4 group games against Malampa Revivors, Rainbow, Eastland and Rangers. After the tournament four players joined Vanuatu top club Shepherds United: Sison Joshua, Greg Vetkon, Klensly Jayvie and Timothy Bila

Honours
Unknown

References

Football clubs in Vanuatu
1978 establishments in the New Hebrides
Association football clubs established in 1978